The 1990 Delaware Fightin' Blue Hens football team represented the University of Delaware as a member of the Yankee Conference during the 1990 NCAA Division I-AA football season. Led by 25th-year head coach Tubby Raymond, the Fightin' Blue Hens compiled an overall record of 6–5 with a mark of 5–3 in conference play, placing in a four-way tie for second in the Yankee Conference. The team played home games at Delaware Stadium in Newark, Delaware.

Schedule

References

Delaware
Delaware Fightin' Blue Hens football seasons
Delaware